The Great Madrasah ( Megálos Mentresés) was a madrasah (school) in Nicosia, Cyprus.

It was the first madrasah in Cyprus. Its building was built in 1573. It included classrooms and dormitories and a fountain was added in 1828. The building of the madrasah was demolished in 1936, but education continued until the 1939–40 academic year until finally being abandoned later in 1940.

It was donated by Ismail Aga, and owned by Evkaf Administration.

References 

Buildings and structures in Nicosia
Ottoman architecture in Cyprus
Education in Cyprus
Islam in Cyprus
Nicosia
16th-century madrasas